Bréauté-Beuzeville is a railway station located in Beuzeville-la-Grenier, Seine-Maritime, France. The station was opened on 22 March 1847 and is located on the Paris–Le Havre railway, Bréauté-Beuzeville–Fécamp railway and Bréauté-Beuzeville–Gravenchon - Port-Jérôme railway. The train services are operated by SNCF.

Train services 
The station is served by the following services:

Regional services (TER Normandie) Le Havre - Bréauté-Beuzeville - Yvetot - Rouen - Paris
Local services (TER Normandie) Le Havre - Bréauté-Beuzeville - Fécamp

References

External links 

 

Railway stations in Seine-Maritime
Railway stations in France opened in 1847